Frank Sinatra Sings the Select Rodgers & Hart is a 1995 compilation album by Frank Sinatra. In this album, Sinatra sings his renditions of Richard Rodgers and Lorenz Hart.

Track listing
 All songs written by Rodgers and Hart.

 "Lover" (from Love Me Tonight; 1932)- 1:53
 "Glad to Be Unhappy" (from On Your Toes; 1936) - 2:35
 "I Didn't Know What Time It Was" (from Too Many Girls; 1939 & Pal Joey; 1957) - 2:47
 "Where or When" (from Babes In Arms & Babes in Arms; 1937 & 1939)- 2:25
 "It's Easy to Remember (And So Hard to Forget)" (from Mississippi; 1935)- 3:34
 "There's a Small Hotel" (from On Your Toes; 1936 & Pal Joey, 1957) - 2:16
 "Wait till You See Her" (from By Jupiter; 1942)- 3:08
 "Little Girl Blue" (from Jumbo; 1935)- 2:54
 "Bewitched, Bothered and Bewildered" (from Pal Joey; 1940 & Pal Joey; 1957) - 3:39
 "I Wish I Were in Love Again" (from Babes In Arms; 1937) - 2:27
 "Spring Is Here" (from I Married An Angel & I Married An Angel; 1938 & 1942)- 4:47
 "The Lady Is a Tramp" (from Babes In Arms, Babes in Arms & Pal Joey; 1937, 1939 & 1957) - 3:14
 "Dancing on the Ceiling" (from Ever Green; 1930) - 2:57
 "I Could Write a Book" (from Pal Joey; 1940 & Pal Joey; 1957) - 3:53
 "Blue Moon" (c. 1934) - 2:51
 "It Never Entered My Mind" (from Higher and Higher; 1940) - 2:42
 "My Funny Valentine" (from Babes In Arms & Pal Joey; 1937 & 1957)- 2:31

Personnel
Frank Sinatra-vocals
Heinie Beau-arranger (Track 1) 
Billy May-conductor (Track 1)
Nelson Riddle-arranger (Tracks 2–6, 7, 9, 10, 11, 13, 14, 16 & 12), conductor (Tracks 2, 4, 5, 7, 8, 10-13 & 15–17)
George Sivaro-arranger (Tracks 8 & 17)
Morris Stoloff-conductor (Tracks 3, 6, 9 & 14)
 Voyle Gilmore – producer
 John Palladino – audio engineer

References

1995 compilation albums
Frank Sinatra compilation albums
Albums produced by Voyle Gilmore